Type 1 dehydrogenase may refer to:
 NADH dehydrogenase (quinone), an enzyme
 NADH dehydrogenase, an enzyme